
Alec Richard Valentine (5 February 1928 – ) was a Scottish former international rugby union footballer. He was born in Hawick.

He also played for RNAS Anthorn, and the Royal Navy, captaining the side.

His older brother Dave was also capped for Scotland, and his youngest brother Rob Valentine was capped for South of Scotland both brothers were subsequently capped at rugby league for Great Britain.

References

Citations

Bibliography
 Bath, Richard (ed.) The Scotland Rugby Miscellany (Vision Sports Publishing Ltd, 2007 )

External links
International Statistics at scrum.com

1928 births
1997 deaths
Athletes (track and field) at the 1954 British Empire and Commonwealth Games
Athletes (track and field) at the 1958 British Empire and Commonwealth Games
British male hammer throwers
Commonwealth Games competitors for Scotland
Royal Navy rugby union players
Rugby union players from Hawick
Scotland international rugby union players
Scottish male hammer throwers
Scottish rugby union players